The Gun Runners is a 1958 American film noir crime film directed by Don Siegel, is the third adaptation of Ernest Hemingway's 1937 novel To Have and Have Not, and starring Audie Murphy. Everett Sloane essays the part of the alcoholic sidekick originally played by Walter Brennan in the film's first adaptation, although Sloane's interpretation is less overtly comic. Eddie Albert delivers a bravura performance as a charismatic villain; other cast members include Jack Elam and Richard Jaeckel. Gita Hall, "Miss Stockholm of 1953", made her Hollywood film debut as Albert's girlfriend Eva.

The earlier remake, titled The Breaking Point (1950), was directed by Michael Curtiz and starred John Garfield.

Plot
Sam Martin (Audie Murphy) runs a charter boat with his alcoholic first mate Harvey (Everett Sloane). He is forced by financial necessity to run guns for the Cuban Revolution but his employer seeks to maximise his profit.

Cast
 Audie Murphy as Sam Martin
 Eddie Albert as Hanagan
 Patricia Owens as Lucy Martin
 Everett Sloane as Harvey
 Richard Jaeckel as Buzurki 
 Paul Birch as Sy Philips
 Jack Elam as Arnold 
 John Qualen as Pop
 Edward Colmans as Juan
 Stephen Peck as Pepito (as Steven Peck)
 Carlos Romero as Carlos Contreras (as Carl Rogers)
 Gita Hall as Eva
 Robert Phillips as Outlaw (uncredited)

Production
This was the first feature from the fledgling Seven Arts Productions. Director Don Siegel was unhappy with having to use Audie Murphy in the lead role.  The film was shot in Newport Beach, California,

See also
 List of American films of 1958

References

External links

1958 films
Film noir
1958 crime drama films
American crime drama films
Remakes of American films
Audie Murphy
Films based on American novels
Films based on works by Ernest Hemingway
Films directed by Don Siegel
Films scored by Leith Stevens
Seafaring films
United Artists films
Films set in Florida
Films set in Cuba
Films about the Cuban Revolution
1950s English-language films
1950s American films